Jens Peter Larsen (14 June 1902 – 22 August 1988) was a Danish musicologist and Haydn scholar. In addition to serving as general editor of two major editions of Haydn's music, he researched and published important papers on the works of George Frideric Handel's music and on the stylistic authenticity of Baroque and Classical performances.

References

Knights of the Order of the Dannebrog
1902 births
1988 deaths
Danish conductors (music)
Male conductors (music)
Danish musicologists
20th-century musicologists
20th-century conductors (music)
20th-century Danish male musicians